The 2018–19 Ohio Bobcats men's basketball team represented Ohio University during the 2018–19 NCAA Division I men's basketball season. The Bobcats, led by fifth-year head coach Saul Phillips, played their home games at the Convocation Center in Athens, Ohio as a member of the East Division of the Mid-American Conference. In non-conference play they had wins over eventual MAAC champion Iona, and both co-champions of the Big South in Radford and Campbell as well as a win over their rival and eventual CIT champion Marshall. They finished the season 14–17 overall, 6–12 in MAC play to finish in last place in the East Division. As the No. 10 seed in the MAC tournament, they were defeated in the first round by Northern Illinois.

On March 13, 2019, head coach Saul Phillips was fired. He finished his five-year tenure at Ohio with an 81–77 overall record. Five days later, the school named Ohio alum Jeff Boals, head coach at Stony Brook, as their new head coach.

Previous season

The Bobcats finished the 2017–18 season 14–17, 7–11 in MAC play to finish in a tie for fourth place in the East Division. They lost in the first round of the MAC tournament to Miami (OH).

Offseason

Departures

Roster

Preseason
The preseason poll and league awards were announced by the league office on October 30, 2019.  Ohio was picked to finish fourth and had no members of the preseason All-MAC team

Preseason men's basketball poll
(First place votes in parenthesis)

East Division
 Buffalo 210 (35)
 Miami 127
 Kent State 122 
 Ohio 121 
 Akron 97 
 Bowling Green 58

West Division
 Eastern Michigan 183  (17)
 Ball State 175 (11)
 Toledo 156 (5)
 Western Michigan 81 (1)
 Northern Illinois 73 
 Central Michigan 67 (1)

Tournament Champs
Buffalo (25), Eastern Michigan (3), Toledo (3), Central Michigan (1), Miami (1), Northern Illinois (1), Western Michigan (1)

Schedule and results

|-
!colspan=9 style=| Exhibition 

|-
!colspan=9 style=| Non-conference regular season

|-
!colspan=9 style=| MAC regular season

|-
!colspan=9 style=| MAC Tournament

Statistics

Team Statistics
Final 2018–19 Statistics

Source

Player statistics

Source

Awards and honors

All-MAC Awards 

Source

See also
2018–19 Ohio Bobcats women's basketball team

References

Ohio
Ohio Bobcats men's basketball seasons
Ohio Bobcats men's basketball
2018 in sports in Ohio